James Michael Leathes Prior, Baron Prior,  (11 October 1927 – 12 December 2016) was a British Conservative Party politician. A Member of Parliament from 1959 to 1987, he represented the Suffolk constituency of Lowestoft until 1983 and then the renamed constituency of Waveney from 1983 to 1987, when he stood down from the House of Commons and was made a life peer. He served in two Conservative cabinets, and outside parliament was Chairman of the Arab British Chamber of Commerce from 1996 to 2004.

Under Edward Heath, Prior was Minister of Agriculture, Fisheries and Food from 1970 to 1972, then Leader of the House of Commons until Heath lost office in the wake of the February 1974 election. His party returned to power under Margaret Thatcher in 1979, and Prior was Secretary of State for Employment from 1979 to 1981, disagreeing with some of her views on trade unions and her monetarist economic policies generally. This made him a leader of the so-called "wet" faction in the Conservative ranks. In 1981 he was moved to the less pivotal role of Secretary of State for Northern Ireland, from which he stood down in 1984; he never returned to government.

Early life and career 
Prior was born in Norwich, the son of solicitor Charles Bolingbroke Leathes Prior (1883–1964) and Aileen Sophia Mary (1893–1978), daughter of barrister Charles Storey Gilman. Charles Prior's uncle was head of the family of Prior of Adstock Manor, Bletchley, Buckinghamshire; the family was closely related to the Lake baronets, the Stuart-Menteth baronets, the Blackett family of Wylam, Northumberland, and the Prideaux-Brune family of Prideaux Place, Cornwall. Prior was educated at Orwell Park School, then at Charterhouse School before going on to Pembroke College, Cambridge, where he earned a first class honours degree in Land economy. He performed his two-year National Service as an officer in the Royal Norfolk Regiment of the British Army, serving in Germany and India.

He was first elected to Parliament in 1959, and was Minister of Agriculture, Fisheries and Food from 1970 to 1972, then Leader of the House of Commons and Lord President of the Council until March 1974. He was one of several unsuccessful candidates in the Conservative Party's 1975 leadership election, entering at the second round and gaining 19 votes to Margaret Thatcher's 146.

Cabinet years 
Under Margaret Thatcher he was Secretary of State for Employment from May 1979 to 14 September 1981. Thatcher said of their relationship, "we agreed that trade unions had acquired far too many powers and privileges. We also agreed that these must be dealt with one step at a time. But when it came down to specific measures, there was deep disagreement about how fast and how far to move."

Prior is believed to have annoyed Thatcher by being too friendly with trade union leaders, with Thatcher writing,
 
 

During his period in the Cabinet, he is believed to have angered the right wing of his party and the Prime Minister for not pressing far enough with anti-trade union legislation. In the September 1981 cabinet reshuffle Prior was moved from the Employment portfolio to become Secretary of State for Northern Ireland, an office he held until September 1984. At the time of the reshuffle, it was reported that Prior considered following the sacked Ian Gilmour to the back benches to oppose the Thatcher Government's economic policies. However, Prior ultimately decided to accept being moved to the Northern Ireland Office after consulting cabinet colleagues William Whitelaw, then Deputy Leader of the Conservative Party, and Francis Pym. This transfer was widely seen as a move by Thatcher to isolate Prior, who disagreed with her on a number of economic issues. The post of Secretary of State for Northern Ireland was seen as a dumping ground to marginalise ministers. However, when Prior resigned, Thatcher revealed that she was going to offer him another Cabinet post during the reshuffle, which would have very likely been a non-economic one.

Later years 
In 1986, he collaborated with John Cassels and Pauline Perry to create the Council for Industry and Higher Education (CIHE), which would become the National Centre for Universities and Business in 2013.

He retired from Parliament in 1987, and was created a life peer as Baron Prior, of Brampton in the County of Suffolk, on 14 October 1987.

He was chairman and later vice-president of the Rural Housing Trust.

Following his retirement from politics he was much sought after in the world of business: he served as chairman of both GEC and Allders, and had directorships at Barclays, Sainsbury's and United Biscuits.

Prior was interviewed about the rise of Thatcherism for the 2006 BBC TV documentary series Tory! Tory! Tory! and in 2012 as part of The History of Parliament's oral history project.

Personal life and death 
In January 1954 Prior married Jane Primrose Gifford Lywood, daughter of Air Vice-Marshal Oswyn George William Gifford Lywood, CB, CBE, a developer of the Typex cypher machines, of a landed gentry family of Woodlands, near Sevenoaks, Kent. They had four children. Prior's eldest son David Prior held the seat of North Norfolk between 1997 and 2001, and was appointed Parliamentary-Under Secretary of State for NHS Productivity; he was later, in May 2015, elevated to the peerage in his own right as Baron Prior of Brampton.

James Prior died on 12 December 2016 at the age of 89.

Following Prior's death, Keith Simpson MP said of him: "In many ways he was a larger than life figure. He had a ruddy face, he played up to being the farmer. People underestimated him because he didn't claim to be a Keith Joseph or Enoch Powell parading their intellectualism. But he was somebody who was well-loved by the grassroots and was a decent man who was in politics out of a sense of public service."

References

External links 

|-

|-

|-

|-

|-

|-

1927 births
2016 deaths
Military personnel from Norwich
20th-century British Army personnel
Alumni of Pembroke College, Cambridge
British Secretaries of State
British Secretaries of State for Employment
Conservative Party (UK) MPs for English constituencies
Conservative Party (UK) life peers
Leaders of the House of Commons of the United Kingdom
Lord Presidents of the Council
Agriculture ministers of the United Kingdom
Members of the Privy Council of the United Kingdom
People educated at Charterhouse School
People from the Borough of Waverley
Royal Norfolk Regiment officers
Secretaries of State for Northern Ireland
UK MPs 1959–1964
UK MPs 1964–1966
UK MPs 1966–1970
UK MPs 1970–1974
UK MPs 1974
UK MPs 1974–1979
UK MPs 1979–1983
UK MPs 1983–1987
Life peers created by Elizabeth II